Forest Creek is a locality in the Shire of Douglas, Queensland, Australia.

Geography
The Daintree River forms the southern boundary.

References 

Shire of Douglas
Localities in Queensland